The Operation Vijay Star is a service medal for recognition of Armed Forces personnel and civilians who participated in combat operations during Operation Vijay in 1999. Those personnel who were mobilised but did not serve in the conflict zone were eligible for the Operation Vijay Medal.

Criteria
The medal is awarded to all personnel of the following forces who participated in ‘OP VIJAY’ against the enemy in the area of conflict/operations on the ground, on the sea or in the air as specified. The eligible period of service was from 1 May 1999 to 31 October 1999.

It is awarded in all ranks including ground operations, naval operations and air operations.

Design
The medal is styled and designated the "OP VIJAY STAR" (hereafter referred to as the medal). The medal is in the form of a six-pointed star with beveled rays, made of Tombac bronze, 40 mm across with one point uppermost to which is fitted a ring for the riband. On the obverse in the centre, it has the state emblem with the national motto superimposed and a circular band (2 mm in width and 20 mm in diameter at its outer edges) surrounding the state emblem and broken at the heads of the lions. On this band is inscription OP VIJAY STAR on either side of the State Emblem in raised letters. The reverse of the medal is plain. A sealed pattern of the medal is deposited and kept. The medal is worn suspended from the left breast by a silk riband which is 32 mm in width. The riband is divided into three equal parts of steel grey, with red and light blue stripes of 4 mm each.

References

External links

Military awards and decorations of India
Awards established in 2001
2001 establishments in India
Kargil War